Fashapuyeh District is in Ray County, Tehran province, Iran. At the 2006 National Census, its population was 29,343 in 7,325 households. The following census in 2011 counted 38,311 people in 10,433 households. At the latest census in 2016, the district had 55,642 inhabitants in 14,678 households.

Shur Fashapoye River 
The Shore River originates from Zanjan Province and after passing through Qazvin Province, southwest of Tehran Province and Zarandieh City, it reaches Ray City. The famous branches of this river are: Kherrud, Abharrud, Kordan, Surud in Zarandieh city.

The long, salty river crosses the width of Ray city with a northwest-southeast direction. This river passes 6 km south of Hassan Abad Feshapoyeh and flows into the salt marsh east of the Sultan Pool lake in Qom. The Shore River flows in a part of Ray parallel to the Karaj River and to the south of it with an average distance of 10 kilometers, and with a large right-turning arc, it leaves Feshapoye Ray and enters Qomroud village. . This river is permanent and has a length of 420 kilometers.

References 

Ray County, Iran

Districts of Tehran Province

Populated places in Tehran Province

Populated places in Ray County, Iran